Kadirov (masculine) is a patronymic surname derived from the given name Qadir. 

The surname may refer to:
Bakhodur Kadirov, Tajikistani wrestler
Hatam Kadirov (d. 1942), Soviet soldier and prisoner-of-war

See also
Kadyrov

Patronymic surnames